Daniel Webster Shannon (March 23, 1865 – October 24, 1913) was an American Major League Baseball player and manager. During the season, he became player-manager for a total of 56 games, of which only 10 were victories. In , he jumped to the Players' League and played for the Philadelphia Athletics and the New York Giants that season. When the league folded the following year, he moved over the Washington Statesmen, and again was named player-manager during the season, this time for a period of 49 games winning only 15.

Dan moved on to minor leagues after his Major League career was over, and was the manager for the Buffalo Bisons of International League in  when he was fired by owner for his "drunkenness". He died at age of 48 in his hometown of Bridgeport, Connecticut, and was buried in the St. Michael's Cemetery in Stratford, Connecticut.

See also
List of Major League Baseball player-managers

References

External links

1865 births
1913 deaths
19th-century baseball players
Baseball players from Connecticut
Major League Baseball second basemen
Major League Baseball player-managers
Louisville Colonels players
Louisville Colonels managers
Philadelphia Athletics (PL) players
New York Giants (PL) players
Washington Statesmen players
Washington Statesmen managers
Sportspeople from Bridgeport, Connecticut
Minor league baseball managers
Hartford (minor league baseball) players
New Britain (minor league baseball) players
Bridgeport Giants players
Lynn (minor league baseball) players
Newburyport Clamdiggers players
Oshkosh (minor league baseball) players
Newark Trunkmakers players
Omaha Omahogs players
Omaha Lambs players
New Haven Nutmegs players
Buffalo Bisons (minor league) players
Macon Central City players
Macon Hornets players
Wilkes-Barre Coal Barons players
Rochester Blackbirds players
Rochester Brownies players
Montreal Royals players
Burials in Connecticut